Maryknoll House is a Grade I historic building located in Stanley, Hong Kong.

History
Built in 1935, Maryknoll House served as the local headquarters of the Maryknoll Fathers and Brothers, and also as a summer rest home and a language school for priests who were going to preach in China.

References

Further reading

External links

 The Stanley House (A Short History)
 Gwulo.com entry
 
 Pictures of Maryknoll House (Stanley)

Maryknoll
Grade I historic buildings in Hong Kong
Religious buildings and structures completed in 1935
Stanley, Hong Kong